Champaka viridimaculata (synonym Platylomia viridimaculata) is a cicada species from Borneo and Peninsular Malaysia.

References

Insects of Borneo
Invertebrates of Malaysia
Taxa named by William Lucas Distant
Insects described in 1869
Dundubiini